Joseph Reshard Crawford II (born June 17, 1986) is an American former professional basketball player. He formerly played at the University of Kentucky and was selected with the 58th overall pick by the Los Angeles Lakers in the 2008 NBA draft. He signed with the Lakers on August 27, 2008, but was waived October 22, during the 2008–09 pre-season.

High school and recruitment
Crawford attended Renaissance High School in Detroit, where he led his team to a perfect 27–0 record and a state title. He was named a McDonald's All-American in 2004. Crawford originally committed to play for the University of Michigan, but reopened his recruitment and chose to attend the University of Kentucky as part of a freshman class that also featured Ramel Bradley and All-Americans Rajon Rondo and Randolph Morris.

College career
Crawford became a bigger part of the team's rotation in his sophomore season, averaging 10.2 points and 3.9 rebounds per game.

During his junior year, Crawford started 32 of 34 games and averaged 14 points, 4 rebounds, and 2.4 assists per game. He was the leading scorer in 8 games and set a new career high in an overtime loss against the Georgia Bulldogs with 29 points.

Crawford became the 54th Wildcat to score 1,000 points in his career on December 1, 2007, against the North Carolina Tarheels.

On March 20, 2008, Crawford closed his career with a loss to Marquette Golden Eagles in the opening round of the NCAA tournament. Crawford was the game's high scorer, matching a career-best with 35 points before fouling out.

Professional career
Joe Crawford was drafted by the Los Angeles Lakers with the 58th overall pick in the second round of the 2008 NBA draft. He signed with the Lakers on August 27, 2008. Crawford was waived by the Lakers on October 22, 2008. Crawford had played in all three exhibition games during the NBA pre-season, averaging 8.3 minutes and 2.7 points. Crawford had to make the team in order for his contract to be guaranteed. Crawford then played in the NBA Development League for the Los Angeles Lakers affiliate Los Angeles D-Fenders. On March 26, 2009, Crawford was called up from the D-League by the New York Knicks and signed a 10-day contract. On April 6, 2009 he signed with the Knicks for the rest of the season. On October 22, 2009, Joe Crawford was waived from the Knicks' roster.

After playing for the Orlando Magic's summer league team in the summer of 2010, Crawford signed a non-guaranteed contract with the Sacramento Kings. He was released on October 15.
Joe Crawford then joined his former University of Kentucky teammate Randolph Morris on the Beijing Ducks. He later played with Maccabi Rishon LeZion of Israel.

On January 18, 2015, he was acquired by the Erie BayHawks of the NBA Development League. On October 12, he left Erie to sign in the newly formed AmeriLeague; however, the league folded after it was discovered the founder was a con-artist.

Personal life
Crawford's brother, Jordan Crawford, played college basketball for Indiana and Xavier.

References

External links
 
Official Kentucky bio
2008 NBA Draft: Joe Crawford

1986 births
Living people
American expatriate basketball people in China
American expatriate basketball people in Israel
Basketball players from Detroit
Beijing Ducks players
Erie BayHawks (2008–2017) players
Jiangsu Dragons players
Kentucky Wildcats men's basketball players
Los Angeles D-Fenders players
Los Angeles Lakers draft picks
Maccabi Rishon LeZion basketball players
McDonald's High School All-Americans
New York Knicks players
Parade High School All-Americans (boys' basketball)
Shooting guards
Small forwards
American men's basketball players
Renaissance High School alumni